Orthomegas maryae is a species of beetle in the family Cerambycidae. It is found in French Guiana.

References

Beetles described in 2011
Prioninae